The Joseph Gowing Farm is a historic farmhouse on Page Road in Dublin, New Hampshire.  Built in 1908 as part of a gentleman's farm, it is a reconstruction of a late-18th century farmhouse, and a good example of Georgian Revival architecture.  The house was listed on the National Register of Historic Places in 1983.

Description and history
It is a two-story wood-frame structure, with a hip roof and clapboarded exterior. The front facade faces east, and has a slightly asymmetrical arrangement of windows around the center entrance. The entry is framed by pilasters and a corniced entablature. The building is connected by a single-story ell to a large 19th-century barn with cupola.

The house was built in 1908, reconstructing a c. 1793 farmhouse that was destroyed by fire.  It was built by Louis Cabot, an industrialist who owned a large gentleman's farm, whose manager occupied this house.  The structure is technically Georgian Revival, as it is a reconstruction, but it is supposedly faithful to the original, which had added Federal style details, including corner pilasters and a bracketed cornice.  The original house, in addition to its association with the locally prominent Gowing family, was also owned by Governor Samuel Hale before becoming part of the Cabot farm.

See also
National Register of Historic Places listings in Cheshire County, New Hampshire

References

Houses on the National Register of Historic Places in New Hampshire
Colonial Revival architecture in New Hampshire
Houses completed in 1908
Houses in Dublin, New Hampshire
National Register of Historic Places in Dublin, New Hampshire
1908 establishments in New Hampshire